Richard Adjei (30 January 1983 – 26 October 2020) was a German bobsledder who competed since 2007. He was also an American football linebacker.

Bobsleigh career
His first World Cup event at Königssee, Germany earned him a win in the two-man event on 9 January 2010. Adeji won silver in the two-man event at the 2010 Winter Olympics in Vancouver as a pusher in tandem with driver Thomas Florschütz. He also won the gold medal in the World Championship four-man event at Königssee in 2011, as second brakeman in the bob piloted by Manuel Machata.

Adjei died on 26 October 2020 from a heart attack at the age of 37.

American football career
Adjei was also an American football linebacker for Rhein Fire, Berlin Thunder in the NFL Europe and Düsseldorf Panther in the German Football League.

References

External links

1983 births
2020 deaths
German male bobsledders
Sportspeople from Düsseldorf
German sportspeople of Ghanaian descent
Bobsledders at the 2010 Winter Olympics
Olympic bobsledders of Germany
Olympic silver medalists for Germany
German players of American football
American football linebackers
Rhein Fire players
Berlin Thunder players
Olympic medalists in bobsleigh
Medalists at the 2010 Winter Olympics
German Football League players
21st-century German people